The 1931–32 season was the 55th Scottish football season in which Dumbarton competed at national level, entering the Scottish Football League and the Scottish Cup.  In addition Dumbarton competed in the Dumbartonshire Cup.

Scottish League

The tenth season in a row in the Second Division saw Dumbarton no closer to gaining promotion as another poor start to the league campaign, which saw only 5 wins by the turn of the year, put paid to any hopes for a further season. In the end, fortunes were to improve, and Dumbarton finished 12th out of 20, with 38 points - 17 behind champions East Stirling.

Scottish Cup

Dumbarton were knocked out in the first round by Hamilton.

Dumbartonshire Cup
Dumbarton retained the Dumbartonshire Cup, beating Vale Ocaba in the final over two legs.

Friendlies

Player statistics

|}

Source:

International Caps
Harry Chatton was selected to play for the Irish Free State national team against Spain on 31 December 1931.

In addition, Alex and Willie Parlane won their first and second caps respectively playing for Scotland Amateurs against Ireland on 23 January 1932.

Transfers

Players in

Players out 

In addition William Barrie, Stewart Lennie, James MacNish and John McNiven all played their last games in Dumbarton 'colours'.

Source:

References

Dumbarton F.C. seasons
Scottish football clubs 1931–32 season